The 1979 World Snooker Championship (also known as the 1979 Embassy World Snooker Championship for sponsorship reasons) was a ranking professional snooker tournament that took place from 16 to 28 April 1979 at the Crucible Theatre in Sheffield, England. Organised by the World Professional Billiards and Snooker Association (WPBSA), it was the third consecutive World Snooker Championship to be held at the Crucible, the first tournament having taken place in 1977.

A qualifying event for the championship was held, producing eight qualifiers who joined the eight invited seeded players in the main event. The tournament was broadcast in the United Kingdom by the BBC, and was sponsored by the Embassy cigarette company. The winner received £10,000 from the total prize fund of £35,000.

Tournament debutant Terry Griffiths met Dennis Taylor in the final, which was a best-of-47- match. Griffiths won the match 24–16, to become the first player to proceed from the qualifying competition and win the title at the Crucible. There were 13 century breaks compiled during the championship, the highest of which was 142 by Bill Werbeniuk.

Overview
The World Snooker Championship is an annual professional snooker tournament organised by the World Professional Billiards and Snooker Association (WPBSA). Founded in the late 19th century by British Army soldiers stationed in India, the cue sport was popular in the British Isles. However, in the modern era, which started in 1969 when the World Championship reverted to a knockout format, it has become increasingly popular worldwide, especially in East and Southeast Asian nations such as China, Hong Kong and Thailand.

Joe Davis won the first World Championship in 1927, hosted by the Billiards Association and Control Council, the final match being held at Camkin's Hall in Birmingham, England. Since 1977, the event has been held at the Crucible Theatre in Sheffield, England. The 1979 championship featured sixteen professional players competing in one-on-one snooker matches in a single-elimination format, each match played over several . These competitors in the main tournament were selected using a combination of the top players in the snooker world rankings and the winners of a pre-tournament qualification stage.

Tournament summary
 Griffiths began the tournament by defeating Bernard Bennett and Jim Meadowcroft in the qualifying rounds. At the Crucible, he defeated Perrie Mans in the first round, followed by a 13–12 victory over Alex Higgins in the quarter-final. In the semi-final he trailed Eddie Charlton by 16–17 before winning 19–17 at 1:40a.m., the latest finish of any match at the time. Griffiths then beat future champion Dennis Taylor 24–16 in the final, to win the world title at his first attempt. He became the first qualifier to win the title at the Crucible. 
 Kirk Stevens and future six-time champion Steve Davis made their Championship debuts, but they lost in the last-16 round: 8–13 to Fred Davis and 11–13 to Dennis Taylor, respectively.
 Aged 65 years and 247 days, Fred Davis became the oldest ever player to win a match at the Crucible. Three days later he also became the oldest player to reach the quarter-finals.
 John Williams refereed the final.

Prize fund
The breakdown of prize money for this year is shown below: 

 Winner: £10,000
 Runner-up: £5,000
 Third place: £3,000
 Fourth place: £2,000
 Quarter-final: £1,250
 Last 16: £1,000
 Highest break: £500
 Maximum break: £10,000
 Total: £35,500

Main draw
The results for the tournament are shown below. The numbers in brackets denote players seedings, whilst players in bold are match winners.

Qualifying
The results from the qualifying competition are shown below, with match winners denoted in bold:

Century breaks 
There were 13 century breaks at the championship, the highest being 142 by Bill Werbeniuk. There was also a £5,000 bonus for compiling a higher break than the championship record of 142.

 142  Bill Werbeniuk
 125  Cliff Thorburn
 121, 120, 107, 101  Terry Griffiths
 112, 105  Alex Higgins
 112  John Spencer
 110, 109  Fred Davis
 106  Eddie Charlton
 106  Dennis Taylor

References

1979
World Championship
World Snooker Championship
Sports competitions in Sheffield
World Snooker Championship